Yiwulü Mountain or simply Lü Mountain is located in the western part of Beizhen City, in Jinzhou City, Liaoning Province. It is one of the Three Greatest Mountains of Northeast China, together with Qianshan and Mount Changbai.

Its highest peak is 867 meters above sea level.  It is located about 5 kilometers west of the center of Beizhen City, Jinzhou, Liaoning Province.

Mountains of Liaoning
Jinzhou